Madonna and Child with Saint Martin and Saint Catherine is an oil on canvas painting by Moretto da Brescia, executed c. 1530, now on the high altar in the church of San Martino in Porzano, Province of Brescia. It is the painter's first mature work and forms an important step towards his Coronation of the Virgin Altarpiece.

References

1530 paintings
Paintings in the Province of Brescia
Paintings of Catherine of Alexandria
Paintings of Pope Martin I
Paintings of the Madonna and Child by Moretto da Brescia
Altarpieces